Stephanie Fraser (born 29 November 1992), is an English folk rock, singer-songwriter from Lancashire, England.

Early life and education 
Steph Fraser was born in Blackpool, England.

She graduated from Rossall School, a public school in Fleetwood. While she was at school, Fraser received music scholarship at the age of 11. Fraser was signed by Island Records when she was studying at Leeds College of Music.

Career
Fraser has toured extensively in the UK and Canada including 2007 performances at the BBC Radio 2 Blackpool Illuminations Switch On Event, where she played in front of 19,000 people and shared the bill with McFly, Natalie Imbruglia and Natasha Bedingfield. This was after she had won the Blackpool Evening Gazette young talent contest.

In March 2008, she was invited to perform at Canadian Music Week at the Fairmont Royal York Hotel in Toronto. Her label provided her with the opportunity to record at Catherine North Studios in Hamilton, Ontario while she was in Canada. The recordings, which were overseen by Canadian producer Dan Achen resulted in her first EP "Purple Sun" being released in May the same year. The single was well received with R2 (Rock'n'Reel) magazine saying she had real potential.

The single was also featured on the BBC Radio Merseyside show "On The Beat" hosted by Spencer Leigh. One of the panel members was Sam Leach the former Beatles mentor and promoter who said that Fraser was heading for the big time and that he could "listen to her all night". Fraser was involved in a transatlantic link up with BBC Radio Lancashire who interviewed her in Canada, and subsequently featured her in numerous programs, including sessions and intimate theatre performances at their studios in Blackburn, Lancashire. In August 2008, she embarked on her first Canadian tour where she played 10 shows including a support slot to Canadian folk singer Heather Dale. She also recorded another batch of songs at Catherine North Studios during the trip.

Fraser parted company with collaborator Stephen Ladley in 2008, and began working with young musician Phil Simpson.  She performed for the second time at both Canadian Music Week 2009 and Liverpool Sound City 2009 as a showcasing artist.

She released her second EP Pretend in May 2009, which used a song from the Catherine North Studios sessions, and also two tracks recorded at Spacehouse Studios in London, which was produced by Nick Jackson from the band IT. Rupert Greenall from the band The Fixx also collaborated and played on the tracks.

In June 2009, Fraser and Simpson recruited Cajon player Matt Lockwood and started touring as a trio, and played at the Beverley Folk Festival, the Hull Freedom Festival and the Musicport World Music Festival in Bridlington. The third EP Recession Proof was released on Sonic Vista Music in November 2009.  Fraser opened for British comedian Phil Cool at two shows in November and December 2009.  In 2010, she left Sonic Vista Records and embarked on a new path.

Discography

EPs
 Purple Sun (2008 – SVRCD005)
 "Purple Sun"
 "Weight of Water"
 "Since I Saw You"
 "Purple Sun (Radio Edit)"

 Pretend (2009 – SVRCD008)
 "Pretend"
 "Swimming into The Dark"
 "Ballad of a Smart Arse"
 "Tea"

 Recession Proof (2009 – SVRCD013)
 "Recession Proof"
 "Roading"
 "Bird Song"

References

External links
Official website
YouTube
Hamilton Spectator, Canada article
Video for "Weight of Water"
Umusic.co.uk

1992 births
Living people
English women singer-songwriters
English women guitarists
English guitarists
Musicians from Lancashire
British folk rock musicians
21st-century English women singers
21st-century English singers
21st-century British guitarists
21st-century women guitarists